Cornelis Johannes Grobbelaar (born 30 December 1997) is a South African rugby union player for the  in the United Rugby Championship and the  in the Currie Cup. His regular position is hooker.

Rugby career

Grobbelaar was born and grew up in Paarl. He attended and played rugby for Paarl Gymnasium and was selected for the  squad for the 2015 Under-18 Craven Week tournament. His team won the main match at the tournament held in Stellenbosch, beating  95–0 in the final. After the Craven Week tournament, Grobbelaar was selected for the South Africa Schools squad that participated in the 2015 Under-18 International Series. He started all three of their matches; he scored a try in their 42–11 win over Wales in their first match and helped his team to wins over France and England in the other two.

After school, he moved to Pretoria to join the  academy. He played for them at Under-19 level in 2016, and the following year he was selected in the South Africa Under-20 squad for the 2017 World Rugby Under 20 Championship. He started all five matches at the tournament, helping his side to a 23–23 draw against France, a 38–14 victory over Georgia and a 72–14 win over Argentina (a match in which Grobbelaar scored two of South Africa's eleven tries) as South Africa topped Pool C to qualify for the semi-finals. A 22–24 defeat to England in the semi-finals ended their hopes of winning the competition, but they bounced back in the third-place play-off to beat France 37–15, with Grobbelaar scoring a further two tries.

He became a regular on the Blue Bulls' replacement bench during the season, making a total of ten appearances.

Honours
 Super Rugby Unlocked winner 2020
 Currie Cup winner 2020–21
 Pro14 Rainbow Cup runner-up 2021
 United Rugby Championship runner-up 2021–22
 Selected in the United Rugby Championship "Dream Team" for the 2021–22 season.
 Bulls URC Players' Player of the Year 2022

References

South African rugby union players
Living people
1997 births
Sportspeople from Paarl
Rugby union hookers
Blue Bulls players
Bulls (rugby union) players
South Africa Under-20 international rugby union players
Rugby union players from the Western Cape